A New Kind of Soul is the debut album by American jazz pianist Larry Willis recorded in 1970 and originally released on the LLP label before being reissued US on Brunswick Records in 1972.

Reception 

Allmusic's Michael G. Nastos said: "More funky. With viable jazz horn sound for support. Easy to like".

Track listing
 "Lickin' Stick" (Alfred Ellis, Bobby Byrd, James Brown) – 3:12
 "Someday Soon" (Larry Willis) – 4:47
 "Funky Judge" (Andre Williams, Leo Hutton) – 4:25
 "Mayibuye" (Christopher Songxaka, Miriam Makeba) – 3:20
 "Consola Coa" (Baden Powell) – 5:37
 "Walking Backward Down the Road" (Burt Bacharach, Hal David) – 4:59
 "Holiday in Barbados" (Willis) – 2:57
 "Hard to Handle" (Otis Redding) – 2:54

Personnel
Larry Willis – piano, arranger
Jimmy Owens, Joe Newman, Marvin Stamm – flugelhorn
Al Gafa – guitar, electric guitar
George Mraz – bass
Al Foster – drums

References

Brunswick Records albums
Larry Willis albums
1970 albums